Port Ochakiv is a seaport that is located in the Ochakiv Raion, Mykolaiv Oblast, Ukraine. In 2008-2011, the port built a berth wall 140 meters long, as well as a grain processing complex and warehouse, which allows for the accumulation of shipments of grain cargo.

See also
List of ports in Ukraine
Transport in Ukraine
Water transport of Ukraine
Cargo turnover of Ukrainian ports

References

Companies based in Mykolaiv Oblast
Ports of Mykolaiv
Ports and harbours of Ukraine
Ports and harbours of the Black Sea
Transport in Mykolaiv
Buildings and structures in Mykolaiv Oblast
Water transport in Ukraine